Gafencu Men is a monthly men's lifestyle magazine published in Hong Kong and mainland China.

Gafencu Men was established in 2007. The magazine is published by Total Media on a monthly basis. It has two language editions: English edition for Hong Kong and Mandarin Chinese for China. Its target audience is affluent Chinese men and business professionals. Since 2009, the magazine has presented the Best of the Best Awards.

References

External links

2007 establishments in China
Magazines published in China
Chinese-language magazines
English-language magazines
Magazines published in Hong Kong
Lifestyle magazines
Magazines established in 2007
Men's magazines
Monthly magazines published in China